Irrationalism is a philosophical movement that emerged in the early 19th century, emphasizing the non-rational dimension of human life. As they reject logic, irrationalists argue that instinct and feelings are superior to the reason in the research of knowledge.  The term has often been used as a pejorative designation of criticisms against rationalism as a whole. 

The philosophy of rationalism, understood as having first emerged in the writings of Francis Bacon and René Descartes, has received a variety of criticisms since its inception. These may entail a view that certain things are beyond rational understanding, that total rationality is insufficient to human life, or that people are not instinctively rational and progressive.

History 
György Lukács has argued that the first period of irrationalism arose with Schelling and Kierkegaard, in a fight against the dialectical concept of progress embraced by German idealism.

Ontological irrationalism, a position adopted by Arthur Schopenhauer, describes the world as not organized in a rational way. Since humans are born as bodies-manifestations of an irrational striving for meaning, they are vulnerable to pain and suffering.

Oswald Spengler believed that the materialist vision of Karl Marx was based on nineteenth-century science, while the twentieth century would be the age of psychology:

References